The 1974–75 season was PAOK Football Club's 49th in existence and the club's 16th consecutive season in the top flight of Greek football. The team entered the Greek Football Cup in first round, and also participated in the UEFA Cup Winners' Cup.

Players

Squad

Transfers

Players transferred in

Players transferred out

Kit

Pre-season

Competitions

Overview

Managerial statistics

Alpha Ethniki

Standings

Results summary

Results by round

Matches

Greek Cup

Third round

Fourth round

Quarter–finals

Semi–finals

UEFA Cup Winners' Cup

First round

Statistics

Squad statistics

! colspan="13" style="background:#DCDCDC; text-align:center" | Goalkeepers
|-

! colspan="13" style="background:#DCDCDC; text-align:center" | Defenders
|-

	

! colspan="13" style="background:#DCDCDC; text-align:center" | Midfielders
|-

! colspan="13" style="background:#DCDCDC; text-align:center" | Forwards
|-

	
|}

Source: Match reports in competitive matches, rsssf.com

Goalscorers

Source: Match reports in competitive matches, rsssf.com

External links
 www.rsssf.com
 PAOK FC official website

References 

PAOK FC seasons
PAOK